William Reynolds (December 10, 1815 – November 5, 1879) was a rear admiral in the United States Navy who served during the American Civil War. His younger brother (by five years) was United States Army general John F. Reynolds.

Reynolds was born in Lancaster, Pennsylvania, and joined the Navy in 1831. In 1837, he was promoted to passed midshipman and to lieutenant in 1841. 

From 1838 to 1842, he served with the U.S. Exploring Expedition, and was among the first to sight the Antarctic mainland, along with Henry Eld.

He was subsequently given command of the depot there.

In 1865, Reynolds was promoted to captain and given command of the screw sloop  after the American Civil War, assigned to the Pacific. In 1867, he was the officer to formally claim the Midway Atoll for the United States, after its discovery by a sealing ship in 1859. In 1870, he was made a commodore and was made the Chief of the Bureau of Equipment. In 1873, he was promoted to rear admiral and given command of the Asiatic Squadron from his flagship, the steam frigate . Reynolds served as the acting Secretary of the United States Navy in 1874.

His last foreign tour included an official visit to China. Reynolds' wife, Rebecca Krug Reynolds, became the first American woman to walk on the Great Wall of China.

In 1877, due to failing health, he retired from active service. Reynolds died in Washington, D.C., on November 5, 1879, and is buried next to his younger brother, John F. Reynolds, in the cemetery in Lancaster, Pennsylvania.

See also

References

Rear-Admiral Reynolds. The New York Times. New York, N.Y.: November 6, 1879. pg. 4, 1 pgs

External links

 Reynolds Family Papers Collection : Franklin & Marshall College

Union Navy officers
United States Navy rear admirals (upper half)
People from Lancaster, Pennsylvania
1815 births
1879 deaths
People of Pennsylvania in the American Civil War
People of the United States Exploring Expedition